The Foster House in Union Springs, Alabama is the best example of Moorish Revival architecture in Alabama. The house was built by Dr. Sterling J. Foster, a physician, who built the house over five years from 1854. The house remained in the Foster family until 1947.

The two-story wood-frame house is capped by a low-slope hipped roof. Its chief distinguishing feature is a two-story three-bay front porch with a deep spandrel at the top. The spandrel is cut out with ogee arches. A small balcony spans the upper level over the center-hall entrance. Double doors at the main entrance and off the balcony open into a center hall. There are two rooms on either side of the hall on both levels. A half-octagonal addition from 1896 houses bathrooms on both levels. Interior woodwork is mainly the house's original Greek Revival trim.

The Foster House was placed on the National Register of Historic Places on August 14, 1998.

References

External links

Houses on the National Register of Historic Places in Alabama
Greek Revival houses in Alabama
Houses completed in 1854
Buildings and structures in Bullock County, Alabama
Historic American Buildings Survey in Alabama
National Register of Historic Places in Bullock County, Alabama